Kennedy Mudenda (born 13 January 1988) is a Zambian international footballer who plays as a midfielder for Power Dynamos.

Mudenda has made several appearances for the Zambia national football team, playing for the side that reached the finals of the 2007 COSAFA Cup.

References

External links

1988 births
Living people
Zambian footballers
Zambia international footballers
Association football midfielders
Power Dynamos F.C. players
Sportspeople from Lusaka
Zambia A' international footballers
2009 African Nations Championship players